Georgios Lampropoulos (born 26 October 1984) is a Greek football midfielder who plays for Ilisiakos. He started his career at Haidari, and he also played for Egaleo, Haidari, AEK Larnaca and Nea Salamina.

References

1984 births
Living people
Greek expatriate footballers
Chaidari F.C. players
Egaleo F.C. players
AEK Larnaca FC players
Nea Salamis Famagusta FC players
Levadiakos F.C. players
Ayia Napa FC players
Ilisiakos F.C. players
Super League Greece players
Cypriot First Division players
Cypriot Second Division players
Expatriate footballers in Cyprus
Association football midfielders
Footballers from Athens
Greek footballers